Neuropeptides B/W receptor 2, also known as NPBW2, is a human protein encoded by the NPBWR2 gene.

The protein encoded by this gene is an integral membrane protein and G protein-coupled receptor. The encoded protein is similar in sequence to another G protein-coupled receptor (GPR7), and it is structurally similar to opioid and somatostatin receptors. This protein binds neuropeptides B and W. This gene is intronless and is expressed primarily in the frontal cortex of the brain.

See also
 Neuropeptide B/W receptor

References

Further reading

External links

G protein-coupled receptors